The Nepalese Armed Forces are the military forces of Nepal. Composed primarily of the ground-based Nepali Army, organized into six active combat divisions, the Nepalese Armed Forces also operates the smaller Nepalese Army Air Service designed to support army operations and provide close light combat support. The Nepalese Army also operates smaller formations responsible for the organization of air defense, logistics, military communications, artillery, and airborne forces within Nepalese territory. In addition, the Armed Police Force acts as a paramilitary force tasked with maintaining internal security within Nepal.

The Nepalese Armed Forces are a volunteer force with an estimated 95,000 active duty personnel in 2010, with an estimated annual military budget of around 60 million US dollars, not including military assistance funding from the Republic of India and People's Republic of China or more recently from the United States of America. Although most of Nepal's military equipment are imports from neighboring India or China, Nepal has received 20,000 M-16 rifles, as well as night vision equipment from the United States to assist ongoing efforts in the post-September 11 global War on Terror campaign. The Nepalese Army bought 1,000 Galil rifles from Israel and received 2 V-5 helicopters from Russia.

Supreme Command 

Article 144 of Interim Constitution of Nepal states that the President of Nepal is the Supreme Commander-in-Chief of Nepal Army.
Currently as the President of Nepal Bidhya Devi Bhandari who was elected on 28 October 2015, is the supreme commander of Nepal Army.

Before the 2006 democracy movement in Nepal forced the King to restore democracy in 2006, Article 119 of the 1990 constitution stated that the King is the Supreme Commander of the Royal Nepal Army. However, following the People's Power revolution in April 2006, the 1990 constitution has been replaced by an interim constitution which has removed the King from anything to do with the army. On May 28, 2008, the Monarchy was formally abolished and Nepal was declared a Republic.

The National Defence Council 
Nepal's Interim Constitution's Article 145 has envisioned National Defence Council which includes Prime Minister, Defence Minister, Home Minister and other three minister appointed by Prime Minister which recommends to the Council of Ministers on mobilization, operation and use of the Nepal Army. Upon Council of Ministers recommendation, President authorizes mobilization, operation and use of Nepal Army.

Before the Interim Constitution replaced Constitution of Kingdom of Nepal in 1990, the 1990 constitution had a provision for the defense council. This Council used to have three members: the Prime Minister, the Defence Minister and the Chief of the Army Staff. In accordance with the Constitution, the King (as Supreme Commander) used to "operate and use" the "Royal Nepal Army on the recommendation" of this council.

Battles of Unification campaigns
The Nepalese army fought various battles on the national unification campaigns of the 18th century. These battles of Nepal unification helped the Royal Nepalese army to gain more experience while helping to unify Nepal.

 Battles of Nepal Unification Campaign

Engagements

Battle against Mir Qasim

The fortress of Makawanpur has a historical and military significance for the Nepalese. It was here that the Nepalese defeated superior forces of Mir Qasim in 1763 and seized 500 guns and two cannons. Later on, these weapons were used by Nepalese troops and four companies were established regular, namely, Srinath, Kalibox, Barda Bahadur (Bardabahini) and Sabuj. (Purano) Gorakh Company was established a few months later. It was the first rank and file system beginning a proper organizational history for the Royal Nepalese Army. The battle against Mir Qasim troops was the first battle of the Royal Nepalese Army against a foreign power.

Sardar Nandu Shah was the fortress Commander of Makawanpur with 400 troops, some guns and home-made traditional weapons like Dhanu, Khukuri, Talwar, Ghuyatro etc. They devised different hit-and-run strategies to surprise the enemy. A spoiling attack base was set up on the Taplakhar mountain ridge
for night operations.

Mir Qasim's renowned warrior, Gurgin Khan was the commander on the other side with approximately 2,500 troops with cannons, guns, ammunition and a very good logistics back up. Their attack base was at the bottom of the Makawanpur Gadhi hill. They had planned a night attack. When the enemy's heavy forces marched in December 1762 and arrived at Harnamadi in January 1763, they found all the local houses already evacuated and the area short of food provisions. Makawanpur Gadhi was on top of a mountain, about nine kilometers uphill from the Harnamadi area. Although the Nepalese had physically occupied all the fortresses en route, the enemy was able to initially push them back to the Makawanpur Gadhi area.

About 300 enemy launched a strong attack on 20 January 1763 putting the Nepalese still more on the defensive. But they were totally surprised when they were resting in Taplakhar, as Kaji Vamsharaj Pande led a downhill attack on them Kaju Naharsigh Basnyat led an uphill attack from below them and Nandu Shah led a frontal attack. The smooth coordination among the three, leading their, by now battle-hardened, troops in the dark of the night, led the bewildered enemy to scatter. About 1700 of them died and 30 Nepalese soldiers were lost in that battle. The Nepalese captured
500 rifles and two cannons with other military equipment. More importantly, the battle led to the beginning of a proper organization of the Royal Nepalese Army.

Other major engagements
 Battle of Pauwa Gadhi against Captain Kinloch- 1767 AD
 Anglo-Nepal War 1814 AD
 First Nepal - Tibet War

The relations started forming sour after the Malla rulers started to mint impure silver coins just before their downfall. The Tibetans demanded that the coins be replaced by pure silver ones. When Prithvi Narayan Shah took over, he found that it would be a great loss to him if he conceded to the Tibetan demands. That case remained unsolved due to his untimely demise. Queen Mother Rajendra Laxmi, the Regent of minor King Rana Bahadur Shah, inherited the coinage problem which reached the culminating point in 1888 AD. Another sore point in Nepal-Tibet relations was Nepal's decision to provide refuge to Syamarpa Lama with his 14 Tibetan followers. He had fled from Tibet to Nepal on religious and political grounds. Yet
another cause for conflict was the low quality salt being provided by Tibetans to Nepal. All salt came from Tibet in those days. Tibet ignored the Nepalese ultimatums and that promoted the preparations for war. Nepal was soon preparing to launch multi-directional attacks.

Kerung Axis: Kaji Balbhadra Shah was the main Commander of the offensive attack from Kerung axis. Kaji Kirtiman Singh Basnyat, Sardar Amar Singh Thapa and Kapardar Bhotu Pande were the subordinate commanders under him. Approximately 6,000 troops and 3,200 porters were despatched for this operation. Their main objective was to capture Dirgacha through Kerung. The march of the troops was delayed because Balbhadra Shah became seriously ill. They crossed
Kerung on 20 July 1788 and captured Jhunga on the 3rd of August 1788. Kapardar Bhotu Pande was captured by the Tibetans. The Nepalese troops were reinforced with 2,000 more troops and Kapardar Bhotu Pande was freed from the Tibetans on 14 October 1788.

Kuti Axis (I):Shree Krishna Shah was the Commander and Kaji Ranajit Pande, Sardar Parath Bhandari, Captain Harsa Panta, Captain Naharsingh Basnyat and Captain Shiva Narayan Khatri were the subordinate commanders under him. About 5,800 soldiers and 3,000 porters were allotted for the offensive operation. Later on, Kaji Abhimansingh Basnyat and Ranajit Kunwar also joined this offensive. The Dalai Lama was taken by surprise and to protect his sovereignty, he initiated a parallel approach whereby he asked military help from Sovan Shahi, the King of Jumla in West Nepal, and requested him to launch guerrilla activities and revolt against the Nepalese Army in and around Jumla. Sovan Shahi did revolt at Humla and captured some fortresses. The Dalai Lama also asked for military help from the Chinese Emperor. Additionally, he himself and Panchen Lama of Dirgacha wrote a secret letter to the East India Company seeking military assistance. The Tibetans also initiated propaganda about having constructed a new road through the Tigri valley and establishing a post at the front. They also rumoured that they had assembled an Army of 1,25,000 men. But the Tibetans could get nothing from Jumla, China or the East India Company.

Kuti Axis (II):Kaji Damodar Pande was leading his troops with subordinate commanders Bom Shah, Dev Dutta Thapa and others. He was given about 4,000 troops and his objective was to capture Dirgacha via the Kuti axis. The Battles Nepalese troops, having crossed the Himalayas captured Chhochyang and Kuti in June 1788 and Sikarjong on 3 August 1788, in spite of many difficult logistic limitations. Later, Bahadur Shah was able to provide some reinforcements and improve some logistics arrangements. Still that was not enough and progress was slow. When the Nepalese were about to capture Dirgacha via both Kuti and Kerung, the Tibetans started to make compromises with Nepalese commanders. Bahadur Shah started negotiations, ultimately arriving at a solution. Prisoners were handed back to the Tibetans. Tibet was ready to pay tributes to the tune of Rs. 50,000 in silver coins per annum to Nepal and a treaty was signed on 2 June 1789 in Kerung. The treaty is called the ‘Treaty of Kerung’ by historians Rasuwa Gadhi and Timure were the firm bases in the first Nepal-Tibet war. Syabru Besi and Rasuwa Gadhi were Strategic points in this war. Likewise, Listi and Duguna villages were the main bases for offensive operations against Tibet. They were the forward most dumping places of the Royal Nepalese Army. Although Rasuwa Gadhi and Duguna Gadhi Fortresses were not constructed at the time, the places themselves were important because of their military significance.

 Nepal-Tibet/China War
 Nepalese-Tibetan War

Foreign Involvements
 Royal Nepal Army in Indian Sepoy Mutiny
 Royal Nepal Army in The First World War 1914–1918
 Royal Nepal Army in Waziristhan War
 Royal Nepal Army in Afghan War −1919
 Royal Nepal Army in The Second World War
 Royal Nepal Army in Hyderabad Action – 1948

Domestic Operations
Disarmament of the Khampas – 1974

In 1974, The Royal Nepalese Army (RNA) was mobilized to disarm the Tibetan Khampas who had been using Nepalese soil to engage guerilla war against the Chinese forces. The Khampas had secretly created their base in Mustang (north-west Nepal) and were operating from there against China. The RNA, under immense diplomatic pressure from China and the international community, moved nine infantry units towards the Khampa post in Mustang and gave them an ultimatum to either disarm themselves and surrender, or face consequences. The terms and conditions of their surrender was that they would be given Nepalese citizenship, land, and some money. The Khampa commander Wang Di agreed to surrender but eventually fled the camp. He was later killed in Doti, far-western Nepal by RNA forces while trying to loot a Nepal Police post. This was first time that the RNA was mobilized in such a large number domestically.

Nepalese Civil War

International operations

Nepal Army's long association with UN Peace Support Operations began with the deployment of five Military Observers in the Middle East, Lebanon (UNOGIL/ United Nations Observation Group in Lebanon) in 1958. And the first Nepalese contingent, Purano Gorakh battalion was deployed in Egypt in 1974. Nepal's participation in the UN peacekeeping operations spans a period of 50 years covering Nepal army involved UN Missions are 42,of which latest being UNSMIL in Libya, in which over sixty thousand six hundred and fifty two (60,652) Nepalese soldiers have served in support of UN peacekeeping endeavors. The Nepal Army has contributed Force Commanders, military contingent, military observers and staff officers. Nepalese troops have taken part in some of the most difficult operations, and have suffered casualties in the service of the UN. To date, the number of those lost on duty with the UN is 54, while 57 were seriously wounded.

Its most significant contribution has been of peace and stability in Africa. It has demonstrated its capacity of sustaining large troop commitments over prolonged periods. Presently, Nepal is ranked as the second largest troop contributing country (TCC) to the UN.

 United Nations Interim Force in Lebanon (UNIFIL),
 UNOSOMII the UN Protective Force (UNPROFOR), UN Operational Mission Somalia II,
 UNMIH the United Nations Mission in Haiti.
 UNAMSIL – Currently, Nepal is sending an 800-man battalion to serve in the peacekeeping mission in Sierra Leone (UNAMSIL).
 UNMIS – The Nepalese Army has sent a protection company of 200 personnel in United Nations Mission In Sudan.
 RCHQ – The RCHQ, KASSALA is also manned by the Nepalese Staffs.
 UNMISET – The UN mission in Timor Leste (East Timor)
 MINUSTAH – The UN mission in Haiti
 UNDOF

U.S./Nepal military relations
The U.S.-Nepali military relationship focuses on support for democratic institutions, civilian control of the military, and the professional military ethic to include respect for human rights. Both countries have had extensive contact over the years. Nepali Army units and Nepalese Army Air Service units have served with distinction alongside American forces in places such as Haiti, Iraq, and Somalia.

U.S.-Nepali military engagement continues today through IMET, Enhanced International Peacekeeping Capabilities (EIPC), and various conferences and seminars. The U.S. military sends many Nepalese Army officers to America to attend military schooling such as the Command and General Staff College and the U.S. Army War College. The IMET budget for FY2001 was $220,000.

The EPIC program is an interagency program between the Department of Defense and the Department of State to increase the pool of international peacekeepers and to promote interoperability. Nepal received about $1.9 million in EPIC funding.

Commander United States Pacific Command (CDRUSPACOM) coordinates military engagement with Nepal through the Office of Defense Cooperation (ODC). The ODC Nepal is located in the American Embassy, Kathmandu.

PRC or India & Nepal military relations
India has agreed to resume the military aid to Nepal. The aid was in the pipeline before India imposed an embargo in February 2005 following the seizure of power by the then King Gyanendra. In 2009, People's Republic of China pledged military aid worth Rs100 million to Nepal.

Divisions
The command of the Nepalese army is divided into 8 parts namely.
 Far western division
 North western division
 Mid western division
 Western division
 Mid division
 Valley division
 Mid eastern division
 Eastern division

Statistics
Military branches: Nepalese Army (includes Nepalese Army Air Service), Armed Police Force Nepal, Nepalese Police Force

Military manpower – military age: 17 years of age

Military manpower – availability:
males age 15–49: 6,674,014 (2003 est.)

Military manpower – fit for military service:
males age 15–49: 3,467,511 (2003 est.)

Military manpower – reaching military age annually:
males: 303,222 (2003 est.)

Military expenditures – dollar figure:  $57.22 million (FY02)

Military expenditures – percent of GDP:  1.1% (FY02)

Gorkhas
Nepal is also notable for the Gorkhas. Significant sections of the British Army and Indian Army are recruited from Nepal. This arrangement comes from the days of the British East India Company's rule of India when Company troops tried to invade Nepal and were beaten back. Both sides were impressed with the other, and Gurkhas were recruited into the company's forces. The Gurkhas remained loyal during the Indian Mutiny of 1857 and were kept on in the Indian Army thereafter. Upon Indian independence in 1947, some units went to British service and some to Indian service, with a Britain-India-Nepal Tripartite Agreement signed between the three nations.  The Gorkhas are feared troops, and their signature weapon is the khukuri.

Army pilots training School
The Nepal Army Air service has operated a flying and helicopter pilots training school since 2004 within the 11no. Brigade, it is the only helicopter pilots training school in Nepal,(there is a fixed-wing pilot training school in Bharatpur, Nepal by private pilots training school)  This school produces army air service pilots and civilian too. The school provides the Mil Mi-17, and Eurocopter Ecureuil helicopter flying training.

Women in the military
The Nepali Army started enrolling women from 1961 for technical service and since 2004 for general service. As of 2019 there were 3758 female Junior Commission, Non-Commission Officers and other ranks in general service and 907 in technical service. There were also 183 female officers in the general service and 214 female technical officers.

See also
 Nepal
 Armed Police Force Nepal
 Nepal Police
 Nepalese Army Air Service

References

Further reading

External links
 Official website of the Nepal Army
 Official website of the Armed Police Force of Nepal